State Highway 26 (abbreviated SH-26 or OK-26) is a state highway in Oklahoma. SH-26 serves as a link between SH-31 and SH-9. There are no letter-suffixed spur highways branching from SH-26.

Route description
SH-26 begins at SH-31 on the west side of McCurtain. For its entire length, the highway alternates between passing through forested areas and clearings. It travels eight miles (13 km) in a curving path to the north to the intersection with SH-9, two miles (3 km) west of Keota.

Junction list

References

External links
 SH-26 at OKHighways.com
 SH-26 at Roadklahoma

026
Transportation in Haskell County, Oklahoma